Octopussy and The Living Daylights (sometimes published as Octopussy) is the 14th and final James Bond book written by Ian Fleming in the Bond series. The book is a collection of short stories published posthumously in the United Kingdom by Jonathan Cape on 23 June 1966.

The book originally contained two stories, "Octopussy" and "The Living Daylights", with subsequent editions also including "The Property of a Lady" and then "007 in New York". The stories were first published in different publications, with "Octopussy" first serialised in the Daily Express in October 1965. "The Living Daylights" had first appeared in The Sunday Times on 4 February 1962; "The Property of a Lady" was commissioned by Sotheby's for the 1963 edition of their journal, The Ivory Hammer; while "007 in New York" first appeared in the New York Herald Tribune in October 1963.

The two original stories, "Octopussy" and "The Living Daylights", were both adapted for publication in comic strip format in the Daily Express in 1966–1967. Elements from the stories have also been used in the Eon Productions Bond films. The first, Octopussy, starring Roger Moore as James Bond, was released in 1983 as the 13th film in the series and provided the back story for the film Octopussy's family, while "The Property of a Lady" was more closely adapted for an auction sequence in the film. The Living Daylights, released in 1987, was the 15th Bond film produced by Eon and starred Timothy Dalton in his first appearance as Bond. "007 in New York", meanwhile, provided character and plot elements for the first two films starring Daniel Craig as Bond, Casino Royale and Quantum of Solace.

In 2008, the stories in Octopussy and the Living Daylights were combined with those of For Your Eyes Only to form a new Penguin Books compilation titled Quantum of Solace as a tie-in with the film.

Plots

"Octopussy" 
Secret Service operative James Bond, code name 007, is assigned to apprehend a hero of the Second World War implicated in a murder involving a cache of Nazi gold. Bond appears only briefly in this story, which is told mostly in flashback from the perspective of Major Dexter Smythe, the man Bond has been sent to bring in. Smythe remained in Kitzbühel, Austria, after the war, found the gold with the help of a mountain guide, and killed the guide to keep the gold for himself. Bond was put on the case after the guide's body fell out of a glacier, over 15 years after the murder, and he recognised the man as a ski instructor and father figure from his youth. Smythe is now a melancholy alcoholic widower living alone on the beach, interacting mainly with the residents of its coral reef – including the titular Octopussy, a beloved 'pet' octopus that he feeds and talks to.

Bond chooses not to take Smythe into custody immediately, but leaves him to contemplate his options – suicide or a court martial. While hunting for scorpion fish to feed Octopussy, Smythe suffers a sting and is dragged underwater by Octopussy as the poison sets in. Bond views the death as a suicide, but classifies it as an accidental drowning in order to spare Smythe's reputation.

"The Living Daylights" 
An unusually morose Bond is assigned sniper duty to help British agent 272 escape from East Berlin. Bond's duty is to safeguard his crossing into West Berlin by eliminating a top KGB assassin codenamed "Trigger", who has been dispatched to kill him. Bond takes up a position on the western edge of the border, in a hotel overlooking the no-man's land of broken, brightly lit ground that 272 will have to cross. On each of three nights, he sees a female orchestra arrive for rehearsal and leave, taking particular notice of a beautiful blonde cellist. Once 272 starts to cross the border, Bond sees Trigger get in position to kill him and realizes that it is the cellist. He adjusts his aim at the last moment and shoots her weapon instead of killing her, allowing 272 to reach safety.

Afterward, Bond admits to his spotter that he did not try for a kill shot only because Trigger had been a woman. The spotter is obliged to include this fact in his report, but apologises for having to do so. Bond muses that even though 272 is safe, the mission will be considered a failure because he did not kill Trigger, and he hopes that M will strip him of his 00 number for it.

"The Property of a Lady" 
The Secret Service learns that Maria Freudenstein, an employee known to be a double agent working for the Soviet Union, has just received a valuable item of jewelry crafted by Peter Carl Fabergé and is planning to auction it at Sotheby's. Bond suspects that the resident director of the KGB in London will attend the auction and underbid for the item, to drive the price up to the value needed to pay Maria for her services. Bond attends the auction, spots the man, and leaves to make arrangements for his expulsion from London as persona non grata.

"007 in New York" 
A brief tale in which Bond muses about New York City and his favourite recipe for scrambled eggs, he is on a quick mission to the titular city to warn a female MI6 employee that her new boyfriend is a KGB agent. It is notable for including a rare humorous conclusion and for its mention of Solange, a young lady of Bond's intimate acquaintance who works in a shop, Abercrombie's, "appropriately employed in their Indoor Games Department".

Characters and themes
The author of the "continuation" Bond stories, Raymond Benson, noted that in "The Living Daylights", Bond's thoughts on killing are examined once again, showing that although 007 did not like doing it, he considered that he must kill as part of his duty to complete an assignment. Once the mission is completed, with Bond deliberately not killing the assassin, an attitude of complacency arises, with Bond shrugging off his colleague's complaints about the incident. Academic Jeremy Black sees the colleague, the officious Captain Sender, as the antithesis of Bond and an echo of Colonel Schreiber, the head of security at Supreme Headquarters Allied Powers Europe, who appeared in "From a View to a Kill".

In the act of not killing the assassin, the theme of disobedience is raised in "The Living Daylights", with Bond calling what he has to do "murder" and subsequently dismissing his actions by saying "with any luck it will cost me my Double-0 number". Raymond Benson considered "Octopussy" to be a morality tale, with greed bringing repercussions years later to the main protagonist, Dexter Smythe.

Background
On the morning of 12 August 1964, Fleming died of a heart attack; eight months later, The Man with the Golden Gun was published. The rights to Fleming's works were held by Glidrose Productions (now Ian Fleming Publications) and the company decided that two short stories, "Octopussy" and "The Living Daylights", would be published in 1966.

The story "Octopussy" was written in early 1962 at Fleming's Goldeneye estate in Jamaica. The story is told in the manner of "Quantum of Solace", with Bond as catalyst for story told in flashback, rather than as a main character for action. The topics chosen by Fleming were familiar ground for him to cover, with hidden gold, tropical fish, and the wartime exploits of commandos all coming from elements of his past. Also from the past, or from his acquaintance, were other references used in the story and Miscellaneous Objectives Bureau was a fictional version of Fleming's 30 AU unit. One of Fleming's neighbours in Jamaica, and later his lover, was Blanche Blackwell, mother of Chris Blackwell of Island Records. Fleming had previously used Blackwell's name as the guano-collecting ship in Dr. No, calling it Blanche. Blackwell had given Fleming a coracle called Octopussy, the name of which Fleming used for the story. Octopussy was posthumously serialised in the Daily Express newspaper, 4–8 October 1965.

Fleming originally titled "The Living Daylights" as "Trigger Finger", although when it first appeared, in The Sunday Times colour supplement of 4 February 1962, it was under the title of "Berlin Escape". It was also published in the June 1962 issue of the American magazine Argosy under the same name. For The Sunday Times, Fleming had commissioned Graham Sutherland to undertake the artwork to accompany the piece, at a cost of 100 guineas, although the artwork was not used in the published edition.

As background research to the story, Fleming corresponded with Captain E.K. Le Mesurier, secretary of the National Rifle Association at Bisley for information and to correct some of the more specialist areas of knowledge required for sniper shooting. Part of the background to the plot, of using the noise of the orchestra to cover the crossing over no-man's land, was inspired by Pat Reid's escape from Colditz prisoner-of-war camp, with two escapers having to run across a courtyard under the cover of the noise from an orchestra. The conductor of the Colditz orchestra was Douglas Bader, who played golf with Fleming on a number of occasions. The assassin, Trigger, was partly based on Amaryllis Fleming, Ian's half-sister, a concert cellist with blonde hair, and Fleming managed to get a passing reference to her in the story, saying: "Of course Suggia had managed to look elegant, as did that girl Amaryllis somebody."

"Property of a Lady", which was written in early 1963, was commissioned by Sotheby's for use in their annual journal, The Ivory Hammer, and was published in November 1963 and later in Playboy; Sotheby's chairman Peter Wilson is mentioned by name in the story. Fleming was so unhappy with the final piece, he wrote to Wilson and refused payment for something he considered so lacklustre.

In 1959, Fleming was commissioned by The Sunday Times to write a series of articles based on world cities, material for which later was collected into a book entitled Thrilling Cities; while travelling through New York for material, Fleming wrote "007 in New York" from Bond's point of view. "007 in New York" was originally titled "Reflections in a Carey Cadillac" and it contains a recipe for scrambled eggs, which came from May Maxwell, the housekeeper to friend Ivar Bryce, who gave her name to Bond's own housekeeper, May. The story was first published in the New York Herald Tribune in October 1963 as "Agent 007 in New York", but was subsequently renamed as "007 in New York" for the 1964 US editions of Thrilling Cities.

Release and reception
Octopussy and The Living Daylights was published in Britain on 23 June 1966 by Jonathan Cape and cost 10s.6d. The hardback edition of the book contained only the two stories mentioned in the title, although when the paperbacks editions were published, "The Property of a Lady" was also included. Once again, artist Richard Chopping provided the cover art, although his fee rose, to 350 guineas. The book was published in US by New American Library with illustrations from Paul Bacon. By 2002, "007 in New York" had been added to the book by Penguin Books.

Reviews
Philip Larkin wrote in The Spectator, "I am not surprised that Fleming preferred to write novels. James Bond, unlike Sherlock Holmes, does not fit snugly into the short-story length: there is something grandiose and intercontinental about his adventures that require elbow room and such examples of the form as we have tend to be eccentric or muted. These are no exception." The critic for The Times Literary Supplement wrote that the book was "slight and predictable, and usual sex and violence yield to a plausible use of ballistics and marine biology". Writing in The Listener, Anthony Burgess thought that "in their fascinated poring on things...remind us that the stuff of the anti-novel needn't necessarily spring from a thought-out aesthetic", going on to note that "it is the mastery of the world that gives Fleming his peculiar literary niche". On a personal note, Burgess added "I admired all the Bond books and I'm sorry there'll be no more. A sad farewell to Fleming".

Adaptations

Comic strip adaptation (1966–1967)
Two of the short stories were adapted for publication in comic-strip format, which were published daily in the Daily Express newspaper and syndicated worldwide. The Living Daylights ran from 12 September to 12 November 1966, adapted by Jim Lawrence and illustrated by Yaroslav Horak; the same pair also worked on Octopussy, which ran from 14 November 1966 to 27 May 1967. The story lines for the strips were altered from the original Fleming version to ensure that they contained a glamorous reason for being Bond involved and to include Bond in action. The strips were reprinted by Titan Books in 1988 and then again in The James Bond Omnibus Vol. 2, published in 2011.

Octopussy (1983)
In 1983, Eon Productions loosely adapted elements of two of the stories, "Octopussy" and "The Property of a Lady" for the 13th film in their Bond series, starring Roger Moore as Bond. "Octopussy" provided the title of the film and the background for the character Octopussy, the daughter of a character Bond had allowed to commit suicide, rather than face the shame of arrest and imprisonment. The film also used the plot device of auctioning of a Fabergé egg at Sotheby's from "The Property of a Lady", and as with the story, the auction item was described as being the same "property of a lady".

The Living Daylights (1987)
In 1987, Eon used the plot of "The Living Daylights", almost unchanged, for a section of their 1987 film of the same name. The film starred Timothy Dalton in his first role as Bond, whilst the character of Trigger became that of cello player Kara Milovy.

Casino Royale (2006)
In 2006, Eon used the plot of Fleming's first novel, Casino Royale, for its 21st film of the same name.  However, a main character was named Solange, after the woman featured in "007 in New York".

Quantum of Solace (2008)
In 2008, Eon used the basic premise from the short story "007 in New York" as part of the film Quantum of Solace, specifically its epilogue, in which Bond warns a female intelligence employee that her boyfriend is an enemy agent.

Spectre (2015)
In Spectre, Hans Oberhauser, a background character in "Octopussy", is revealed to be the father of Ernst Stavro Blofeld and a former caretaker of Bond in his youth. The film strongly hinted that Blofeld killed Oberhauser because he felt that Oberhauser loved Bond more than he loved his own son.

See also

 Outline of James Bond

References

Bibliography

Further reading

External links

 
 
 
 Ian Fleming Bibliography of James Bond 1st Editions

1966 short story collections
Books published posthumously
James Bond books
Jonathan Cape books
Octopussy
Short story collections by Ian Fleming
The Living Daylights
Thriller short story collections